Sitting on a Branch, Enjoying Myself is a 1989 Czechoslovak-West German comedy-drama film directed by Juraj Jakubisko. It was entered into the main competition at the  46th Venice International Film Festival.

Synopsis 
A tragi-comedy about the end of World War II and the roll call of the communist regime. With this background you have a part-dream sequence story of the two main characters coming back from the war - comedian Pepe and front line soldier Prengel that become best friends after discovering gold together. By coincidence these two meet Ester who is coming back from a concentration camp and now love enters the story with this melancholic Jewish girl. Three homeless people are trying to fulfill their idea of happiness. They chose the wrong time period. The monstrosity of the 1950s is represented by a fanatic young communist, Želmíra, who turns their world upside-down.

Cast 
Bolek Polívka - Pepe
Ondřej Pavelka - Prengel
Deana Horváthová - Želmíra
Štefan Kvietik - kapitán Kornet
Markéta Hrubešová - Ester
Miroslav Macháček - Krištofík

Film Awards
  Cran Gavier´99 1999  • Prize for the best film
  Moscow International Film Festival 1990  • Grand Prize
  Festival of Czechoslovak film 1990  • Special Jury Prize
 IFF Stasbourg 1990  •Le Prix du Jury and the Alsace Media de Strasbourg Prize
 Venice Film Festival 1989  • Certificate of Merit RAI II

References

External links

Czechoslovak comedy-drama films
Slovak comedy-drama films
West German films
1980s Czech-language films
Slovak-language films
1989 comedy-drama films
1989 films
Films directed by Juraj Jakubisko
German comedy-drama films
1989 comedy films
1989 drama films
1980s German films